Constantin Jude Sports Hall is an indoor arena in Timișoara, formerly known as Olimpia Hall. It was designed by architect Sorin Gavra in 1968. It is used as a base for local basketball, handball, volleyball and futsal teams. Initially, its seating capacity was 2,200, but after a rehabilitation in 2011 the capacity was reduced to 1,400 seats by mounting individual chairs.

References 

Sport in Timișoara
Indoor arenas in Romania
Basketball venues in Romania
Handball venues in Romania
Sports venues completed in 1968
1968 establishments in Romania